is a Japanese manga series written and illustrated by FLIPFLOPs.  An anime television series adaptation produced by Nexus aired from January 3 to March 20, 2020.

Premise
17-year-old high school sophomore Kaname Sudō accepts an online invitation by a friend to play an app game called Darwin's Game, unbeknownst to him that it involves a fight between life and death. Those who play the game are given a Sigil, an ability that varies from player to player. Trapped in this game of relentless murder and conquest, Kaname determines to clear the game, and seek out and kill the Game Master.

It's revealed later in the series that the Game Master is one of many in the multiverse and is actually benevolent, albeit in the greater good way. Monsters called Greed are infiltrating worlds and eating/replacing  people, bringing about Armageddon over and over. Darwin's Game is meant to train Champions to eliminate them.

Characters

Sunset Ravens
One of the clans in the game, to which our heroes belong. Unlike most, they are very benevolent and utterly forbid the game to be played in their territory, Shibuya.

The male protagonist of the story and a 17-year-old high school student who accidentally gets roped into Darwin's Game after the death of his good friends. His Sigil "The Fire God's Hammer", allows him to recreate weapons and other simple objects he has touched before, in addition to modifying them to his will, although this exhausts him easily and the objects created will disappear should he lose consciousness. Despite the ruthless nature of the game, Kaname possesses a kind heart and tries not to kill unless the situation calls for it. His intelligence, rationality and ability to react to situations have developed him to become a top player in Darwin's Game without a single loss. Together with Shuka, he created and leads the clan Sunset Ravens, whose territory is in Shibuya.

The female protagonist of the story and a 18-year-old girl from a rich family. After witnessing the death of her parents at the hands of a Darwin's Game player, she was tricked by a girl named Miho into it, discovered its existence, and slaughtered both Miho and her parents' murderer. She later becomes Kaname's main romantic interest. Her Sigil "Princess of Thorn" allows her to control wire-like objects, which she utilises to wield spiked chains. Her mobility and dexterity with her weapons, coupled with her ruthlessness, has earned her the title of the "Undefeated Queen" that terrorised the area of Roppongi. Together with Kaname, they formed the clan Sunset Ravens. 

A 13-year-old middle school student who acts as an informant for the players of Darwin's Game. Despite her age, her great intellect, maturity and ability to stay calm has earned her the respect of many players. Her Sigil "Laplace's Demon" allows her to calculate physical vectors and knowledge to such an extent to the point where she can visualise the near future, although her ability can be countered by moving in manners that surpass physical limits and conventional predictions. While she would normally prefer to run away, she can fight by combining her ability with a sniper's firepower. After joining Sunset Ravens, she works with Kaname to crack the code behind the game. 

She resembles Dr. K from Power Rangers RPM in some aspects.

 A 21-year-old man that was initially enemies with Kaname during an event, but became friends after working together. His Sigil "Lie Detector" essentially allows him to discern if someone is lying or not, but it doesn't work if the person believes what they are saying is really true or plain ignorant. Since his Sigil grants him no combat ability, he wears bulletproof suits, masks and is heavily armed with artillery when he fights. He joined the game with his brother to earn money at first, but changed his goal to getting revenge on Wang of the Eighth clan after his brother was killed by him. He joined Sunset Ravens and is often seen alongside Sui.

The youngest member of Sunset Ravens with a dual personality due to the presence of her deceased older twin brother Sōta's soul within her body. While Sui is quiet, shy and soft-hearted, Sōta is violent, bloodthirsty and outspoken. Despite their differences, the twins get along very well and their souls can frequently switch to utilise each of their own Sigils respectively. Sui's Sigil, "Pollux Light", allows her to control water, including those within living things, although she is unable to move it quickly; while Sōta's Sigil, "Castor Light", allows him to freeze things, which he uses in conjunction with his sister's to kill.

The top-ranked player of Darwin's Game and a hitwoman-for-hire. Hailing from a clan of Taiwanese assassins, Xuelan primarily relies on her assassin abilities instead of her Sigil, which is unknown to all members of the game, and fights wearing a kitsune mask. She is known for her signature move "Killing Intent" which allows her to psych out her opponents by simulating themselves being stabbed by a katana. Initially trying to convince Kaname to become the heir to her clan after witnessing his abilities, she joins Sunset Ravens after losing a clan duel to them.

 A middle-aged man who was initially at odds against Kaname during an event, but worked together with the group against Wang and the Eighth. He is known as "The Florist" due to his Sigil giving him the ability to control plants, even going so far as being able to control other people if they are incapacitated using plants with narcotic properties. Since his Sigil gives his long-distance combat abilities, he tends to camp out far away from the action, though he will make sure he can see his opponents. He joined Darwin's Game to earn money to pay for his ailing daughter Suzune. He dies during the treasure hunt event at the hands of Eighth members.

Others

An anime-only character and one of Kaname's good friends who sent him an invitation to Darwin's Game in the form of a Help Call. He is killed by Banda-kun at the start of the series.

An anime only character and one of Kaname's good friends who came to his aid during his fight with Banda-kun. His Sigil allows him to see the aura of living things, and he uses a crossbow to fight. He dies of blood loss as Kaname fights, and becomes Kaname's main motivation to find the Game Master and clear the game. In the manga, Kyoda dies while being chased by Banda-kun and his Sigil is never revealed.

One of Kaname's good friends who was held hostage by Wang after the treasure hunt event. He had his fingers mutilated, and joined Darwin's Game per Kaname's intervention, earning a Sigil that allowed him to levitate objects. Despite his newfound power, he is chopped to pieces by Wang and becomes Kaname's main motivation to find the Game Master and clear the game.

Ichiro's daughter. She is diagnosed with a weak heart and her father played Darwin's Game in order to acquire money for her operation. After the treasure hunt event that claimed her father's life, she becomes close friends with Rein, though she remains in the dark about what happened to her father due to the rules about revealing the game's existence to outsiders. She was tricked into joining, dying from the stress and activating her Sigil; it gave her a catgirl transformation (and possibly 8 additional lives). She joined Sunset Ravens.

Kaname's first opponent and an infamous player known as the "rookie hunter" for targeting weak newbies and stealing their points. He joined the game for money and entertainment from his boring job, choosing to wear the local baseball team's mascot costume to conceal his face when he kills. His Sigil "Stealth" lets him turn invisible, although this led to his downfall when a car knocked him over and he lost against Kaname. 

The leader of the notorious yakuza clan Eighth that ruled over Shibuya before the Sunset Ravens came. His Sigil allows him to reach extremely high heights within a second. Bloodthirsty, violent and wicked, he delights in torturing people, having a habit of cutting off their fingers and pickling them into juice. Turns out he foolishly believed himself the protagonist of the game. He is later killed by Kaname, who becomes the next ruler of Shibuya territory. 

Wang's aide, who possesses one of the most powerful abilities in Eighth. His Sigil allows him to manipulate air currents, which he combines with his karate skills to fight both hand-to-hand and long-range.

Media

Manga
FLIPFLOPs launched the series in the January 2013 issue of Akita Shoten's shōnen manga magazine Bessatsu Shōnen Champion which was published on December 12, 2012. The series has been compiled into 27 volumes as of December 2022. The manga entered its final arc on January 11, 2020.

Anime
An anime television series adaptation was announced in the 16th volume of the manga on November 8, 2018. The series is directed by Yoshinobu Tokumoto and written by Shū Miyama, the writer of the FLIPFLOPs duo and also original creator of the manga series, with animation by studio Nexus and character designs by Kazuya Nakanishi. Kenichiro Suehiro is composing the series' music. The series aired from January 3 to March 20, 2020 on Tokyo MX and other channels. The first episode was listed as a one-hour episode and had an advanced screening on the night of December 24, 2019. ASCA performed the series' opening theme song "CHAIN", while Mashiro Ayano performed the series' ending theme song "Alive". Aniplex of America licensed the series, and began streaming the series on FunimationNow, AnimeLab and Wakanim from January 3, 2020, and on Crunchyroll and HIDIVE from February 2, 2020. Funimation produced an English dub for the series. It ran for 11 episodes.

See also
The Everyday Tales of a Cat God, another manga series by FLIPFLOPs

Notes

References

External links
  
 

2020 anime television series debuts
Akita Shoten manga
Anime series based on manga
Aniplex
Battle royale anime and manga
Nexus (animation studio)
Shōnen manga